The Alfred H. Renshaw House is a historic house located at 33 Fiddlers Lane in Colonie, Albany County, New York.

Description and history 
It was built in 1926-1927 and is a brick mansion in the Tudor Revival style. It features three tall chimneys with paired flues, a slate roof with multiple gables, and a Tudor arch around the main entrance. The property includes formal gardens and a gazebo.

It was listed on the National Register of Historic Places on October 3, 1985.

References

Houses on the National Register of Historic Places in New York (state)
Tudor Revival architecture in New York (state)
Houses completed in 1927
Houses in Albany County, New York
National Register of Historic Places in Albany County, New York